José Manuel Pinto Colorado (born 8 November 1975) is a Spanish retired professional footballer who played as a goalkeeper.

After making a name for himself at Celta, with which he made his La Liga debut, he signed for Barcelona in 2008, going on to act as backup for Víctor Valdés the vast majority of his spell and being part of the squads that won 16 major titles, including four national championships and two Champions Leagues.

Pinto appeared in 160 top-flight games over 16 seasons, also representing Real Betis.

Club career

Betis and Celta
Born in El Puerto de Santa María, Cádiz, Andalucía, Pinto, a product of Real Betis' youth system, moved up to the first team and made his La Liga debut for the club during the 1997–98 campaign (one game as a second-half substitute against Racing de Santander).

Unable to dislodge Toni Prats at Betis, Pinto switched to RC Celta de Vigo a year later. He went on to win the Ricardo Zamora Trophy for the 2005–06 season after allowing just 29 goals in 37 matches, a goals per match ratio of 0.78. He was also eventually awarded the captain's armband, appearing in 125 games in the first division and 56 in the second as well as competing in the UEFA Champions League (in 2003–04, although backing up Pablo Cavallero in the domestic league, he would appear in five group stage matches, as Celta progressed to the round-of-16 game) and in the UEFA Cup.

Barcelona
Pinto signed on loan for FC Barcelona on 18 January 2008, with the player arriving as cover for the injured Albert Jorquera after the latter damaged knee ligaments during the festive break. He made his debut on 26 April against Deportivo de La Coruña in a 0–2 away loss; his second match also ended in defeat, as RCD Mallorca came up from behind 0–2 to win it 3–2 at the Camp Nou.

On 30 May 2008, Barcelona signed Pinto on a permanent deal for two years and €500,000. During his first full season he was first-choice in the Copa del Rey which was won, including the final against Athletic Bilbao.

On 22 October 2010, UEFA opened a disciplinary case, charging Pinto with "improper conduct" following his actions in a Champions League group stage match against F.C. Copenhagen, two days earlier. Allegedly, he whistled to fool opponent player César Santin – who was running through on goal in the 26th minute – into thinking he was offside, leading him to stop, believing that the referee, Stéphane Lannoy, had blown his whistle; the referee allowed the play to continue and did not show Pinto a yellow card for the alleged deception. Following the game, Barcelona strongly distanced itself from Pinto's conduct. The incident was captured on video, showing the goalkeeper apparently whistling and then gloating over the incident; after the investigation was concluded, he was suspended for two games.

On 20 February 2011, Pinto made his first league appearance for the Catalans in more than two years (due to a knee injury to Víctor Valdés), playing in a 2–1 home win against Athletic Bilbao and performing well, notably saving a Fernando Llorente header. Again, he started in the domestic cup campaign, including the final against Real Madrid, a 0–1 extra-time loss; the following week, against the same team, in the Champions League semifinals' first leg, he was sent off by referee Wolfgang Stark after a half-time altercation involving himself (he was on the bench), Álvaro Arbeloa and Real Madrid match delegate Chendo, in a 2–0 away win.

In 2011–12, Pinto was once again the starting goalkeeper in the Spanish Cup campaign, with Barcelona again reaching the final. His first league appearance only came on 29 April 2012, in a 7–0 away routing of Rayo Vallecano.

On 11 February 2013, after having agreed to it late into the previous year, 37-year-old Pinto renewed his contract with the Blaugrana, due to expire in June 2013, for a further season. On 19 May of the following year, he was told that his contract would not be renewed and he left.

Personal life
Still as an active footballer, Pinto started working as a musician and a record producer, mainly in hip hop. In 2000 he founded his own label, Wahin Makinaciones, which was also the name of his first release six years later; his musical alter ego was Wahin.

Career statistics

Honours

Club
Celta
UEFA Intertoto Cup: 2000

Barcelona
La Liga: 2008–09, 2010–11, 2012–13
Copa del Rey: 2008–09, 2011–12
Supercopa de España: 2009, 2010, 2011, 2013
UEFA Champions League: 2008–09
UEFA Super Cup: 2009, 2011
FIFA Club World Cup: 2009

Individual
Ricardo Zamora Trophy: 2005–06

References

External links

FC Barcelona profile

Betisweb stats and bio 

1975 births
Living people
People from El Puerto de Santa María
Sportspeople from the Province of Cádiz
Spanish footballers
Footballers from Andalusia
Association football goalkeepers
La Liga players
Segunda División players
Segunda División B players
Betis Deportivo Balompié footballers
Real Betis players
RC Celta de Vigo players
FC Barcelona players
UEFA Champions League winning players
Spanish record producers